is a passenger railway station located in Kawasaki-ku, Kawasaki, Kanagawa Prefecture, Japan, operated by East Japan Railway Company (JR East).

Lines 

Station layout
The station building and entrance is located on the south side of the tracks, with direct access to the up (Shitte-bound) platform 1. The down (Hama-Kawasaki-bound) platform 2 is accessed via an underpass. The station is staffed with simple Suica touch points at the entrance rather than ticket barriers. The station is staffed.

Platforms
The adjacent track (behind platform 2) is the up (Tokyo-bound) track of the Tokaido Freight Branch Line. An additional loop line lies on the north side of the station.

History 
Kawasakishimmachi Station opened on March 25, 1930, initially as a freight-only station on the Nambu Railway's Nambu Branch Line. Passenger services began on April 10, 1930. The Nambu Railway was nationalized on April 1, 1944, becoming part of the Japanese Government Railway (JGR) system, at which time freight services at the station were discontinued. The JGR became the Japanese National Railways (JNR) from 1949.

With the privatization of JNR on April 1, 1987, the station came under the control of JR East.

Passenger statistics
In fiscal 2019, the station was used by an average of 3,009 passengers daily (boarding passengers only). The passenger figures for previous years are as shown below.

Surrounding area
 Kanagawa Prefectural Kawasaki High School
 Kawasaki Watarida Junior High School
 Kawasaki Shinmachi Elementary School

See also
List of railway stations in Japan

References

External links

 JR East Station info 

Railway stations in Japan opened in 1930
Railway stations in Kawasaki, Kanagawa
Stations of East Japan Railway Company
Nambu Line